Songjiazhuang Station is a station on Line 5, Line 10, and the Yizhuang Line of the Beijing Subway. This is an interchange station, terminal for Line 5 and Yizhuang Line. These two stations lie in the perpendicular directions, so that the passengers leaving the train from Line 5 proceed ahead to get to the station of Yizhuang Line. The station handled a peak passenger traffic of 262,800 people on May 5, 2013.

On December 30, 2012, Phase 2 Section 1 of Line 10 opened, passing through Songjiazhuang Station, making Songjiazhuang Station the 3rd 3-way transfer station of Beijing Subway (The first two being Xizhimen Station and Dongzhimen Station).

The Yizhuang Line has three platforms employing the spanish solution. For the Yizhuang Line departing passengers use the middle platform, whereas the arriving passengers disembark to the side platforms.

Station Layout 
The entire station is underground. Line 5 has 2 side platforms. Line 10 has dual-island platforms with a single track between the 2 platforms. The Yizhuang line also has dual-island platforms, using the spanish solution.

With 10 platforms and 7 tracks, the station has the most platforms and tracks on the entire Beijing Subway.

Exits 
There are 9 exits, lettered A, B, C, D, E, F, G, H, and I. Exit G is accessible.

Gallery

References

External links
 

Beijing Subway stations in Fengtai District
Railway stations in China opened in 2007